The following elections occurred in the year 1878.

Europe

United Kingdom 

 1878 Argyllshire by-election
 1878 Belfast by-election
 1878 Boston by-election
 1878 Bristol by-election
 1878 Canterbury by-election
 1878 Carmarthen Boroughs by-election
 1878 Cirencester by-election
 1878 Down by-election
 1878 East Somerset by-election
 1878 Flint Boroughs by-election
 1878 Greenock by-election
 1878 Haddington Burghs by-election
 1878 Hereford by-election
 1878 Leith Burghs by-election
 1878 Londonderry County by-election
 1878 Maldon by-election
 1878 Marlborough by-election
 1878 Mid Somerset by-election
 1878 Middlesbrough by-election
 1878 Middlesex by-election
 1878 New Ross by-election
 1878 Newcastle-under-Lyme by-election
 1878 North Lancashire by-election
 1878 North Staffordshire by-election
 1878 Oxford University by-election
 1878 Oxfordshire by-election
 1878 Perth by-election
 1878 Perthshire by-election
 1878 Peterborough by-election
 1878 Reading by-election
 1878 Rochester by-election
 1878 South Northumberland by-election
 1878 Southampton by-election
 1878 Tamworth by-election
 1878 Truro by-election
 1878 West Kent by-election
 1878 Worcester by-election
 1878 York by-election

Rest of Europe 

1878 German federal election
1878 Papal conclave
1878 Portuguese legislative election

North America
 1878 Newfoundland general election

Canada
 1878 British Columbia general election
 1878 Canadian federal election and 12 By-elections to the 4th Canadian Parliament 
 1878 Manitoba general election 
 1878 New Brunswick general election
 1878 Newfoundland general election
 1878 Nova Scotia general election
 1878 Quebec general election

United States
 United States House of Representatives elections in California, 1878
 1878 New York state election
 United States House of Representatives elections in South Carolina, 1878
 1878 South Carolina gubernatorial election
 1878 and 1879 United States House of Representatives elections
 1878 and 1879 United States Senate elections

See also
 :Category:1878 elections

1878
Elections